Sparwood/Elk Valley Airport  is located  north of Sparwood, British Columbia, Canada.

References

Registered aerodromes in British Columbia
Regional District of East Kootenay